Roberts High School may refer to:

 Owen J. Roberts High School, Pottstown, Pennsylvania
 Roberts High School, Salem, Oregon
 Roberts High School, Roberts, Montana
 Roberts High School, a former high school in Roberts, Illinois